is a former Japanese football player. She played for Japan national team.

Club career
Nagamine was born in Kodaira on 3 June 1968. She played for Shinko Seiko FC Clair until 1990. She was selected Best Eleven in 1990 season. In 1991, she moved to Italian club Reggiana Refrattari Zambelli. She then became the first Asian footballer to play in Serie A. The club won Serie A for 2 years in a row. However, Reggiana was relegated due to financial strain. In 1993, she returned to Japan and joined Suzuyo Shimizu FC Lovely Ladies. However, the club was withdrew from L.League end of 1998 season. The club was disbanded end of 1999. So, she retired.

National team career
On 22 October 1984, when Nagamine was 16 years old, she debuted for Japan national team against Australia. She was a member of Japan for 1991 and 1995 World Cup. She also played at 1986, 1989, 1991, 1993, 1995 AFC Championship, 1990 and 1994 Asian Games. She played 64 games and scored 48 goals for Japan until 1996.

National team statistics

International goals

References

External links
 

1968 births
Living people
Nihon University alumni
Association football people from Tokyo Metropolis
People from Kodaira, Tokyo
Japanese women's footballers
Japan women's international footballers
Nadeshiko League players
Tokyo Shidax LSC players
Suzuyo Shimizu FC Lovely Ladies players
Asian Games medalists in football
Footballers at the 1990 Asian Games
Footballers at the 1994 Asian Games
1991 FIFA Women's World Cup players
1995 FIFA Women's World Cup players
Women's association football forwards
Asian Games silver medalists for Japan
Medalists at the 1990 Asian Games
Medalists at the 1994 Asian Games